WRPB (89.3 FM) is a radio station licensed to Benedicta, Maine, United States.  The station is owned by Light of Life Ministries  and airs God's Country which originates on Oakland, Maine based flagship station, WMDR-FM.

References

External links
WRPB's official website

RPB
Radio stations established in 2011
Mass media in Aroostook County, Maine